"Lay 'Em Down" is the first single released off the album The Outsiders by Christian rock band Needtobreathe. It was released in the June of 2009.

Charts
The song reached No. 8 on Billboard's Hot Christian Songs chart, No. 49 on the Heatseekers Songs, and 98 on the Billboard Hot 100.

Awards

In 2010, the song was nominated for a Dove Award for Rock/Contemporary Recorded Song of the Year at the 41st GMA Dove Awards.

References

2009 singles
Needtobreathe songs
2009 songs
Atlantic Records singles